Oakley is a historic home and farm located near Upperville, Fauquier County, Virginia.

History
It was built between 1853 and 1857, and is a -story, three bay, "T"-shaped brick Italianate style dwelling with a cross-gable roof. The house sits on an English basement and features tall decorative paneled chimneys, semi-hexagonal bays in each gable end, a central two-story pavilion, and a glazed cupola. Also on the property are the contributing original smokehouse and an early building, possibly a tenant house.

The house was built by Colonel Richard Henry Dulany and the property is located near the site of the Upperville Colt & Horse Show first held in June 1852. It remains the oldest such event in America.

It was listed on the National Register of Historic Places in 1983.

References

Houses on the National Register of Historic Places in Virginia
Farms on the National Register of Historic Places in Virginia
Italianate architecture in Virginia
Houses completed in 1857
Houses in Fauquier County, Virginia
National Register of Historic Places in Fauquier County, Virginia
1857 establishments in Virginia